Peppermint Park may refer to:

Peppermint Park, Texas, a defunct amusement park
Peppermint Park (TV series), an American direct-to-video children's show (1987 and 1988)
Peppermint Park, Adelaide Park Lands in South Australia
Peppermint Park, a former theme park in Port Macquaie, Australia